Vallicoccus soli is a species of bacteria from the phylum Actinomycetota.

References

Actinomycetota
Bacteria described in 2020